Trude Eick (born 23 April 1969) is a Norwegian musician (French horn and electronics) and composer, known from different forms of music, in which she plays regular repertoire as well as free improvisation. She is the sister of musicians Mathias Eick and Johannes Eick.

Career 
Eick was born in Drammen and raised in Hof, Vestfold. She is a graduate of the Norwegian Academy of Music and has worked in Forsvarets Musikkorps, Trøndelag for a period. Eick is best known for improvising in Eick/Viddal Duo with bass clarinetist and saxophonist Mathilde Grooss Viddal, which was central to the series "Kvinnelige improviserende instrumentalister". The duo toured with the show Konkylia van Tare og Tusen Tang (2005). As trio they include Hedvig Mollestad Thomassen (guitar), and as quartet with Øyvind Brække (trombone) and Børge Are Halvorsen (saxophone).

She has appeared on releases by Bugge Wesseltoft New conceptions of jazz (1996) and Torbjørn Sunde Octet (2001). She has toured with Ole Bolås and Sigrun Eng (cello), among others, and has at times conducted Chateau Neuf Storband.  She played with Frøy Aagre's Offbeat at Dølajazz (2007).

Eick associated with Toneheim Folk High School and the Music program at 'Rud videregående skole'.

Discography 

Within Ym-Stammen
1994: (Vi Blir) Fisk (Grappa Music)

With Bugge Wesseltoft
1996: New Conception of Jazz (Jazzland Recordings)
2008: New Conceptions of Jazz Box (Jazzland Recordings)

With Finn Coren
1999: Lovecloud (Bard Records)

With Torbjørn Sunde Octet
2001: Where Is The Chet (K&K Verlagsanstalt)

With Anja Garbarek
2005: Briefly Shaking (EMI Music Norway)

With Anders Rogg & Audun Myskja
2005: Videre: Toner Til Refleksjon Og Avspenning (Kirkelig Kulturverksted)

With Marit Larsen
2006: Under the Surface (Virgin Records)
2008: The Chase (Virgin Records)

With Mathilde Grooss Viddal
2006: Holding Balance (Giraffa Records), within Chateau Neuf Fri Ensemble
2008: November Log (Giraffa Records), within Viddal/Eick Duo

With Maria Mena
2008: Cause And Effect (Columbia Records)

With Friensamblet
2009: Come Closer (Giraffa Records)

With Frøy Aagre
2010: Cycle of Silence (ACT Company)

With Dimmu Borgir
2010: Abrahadabra (Nuclear Blast)

With Martin Hagfors
2010: I Like You (Strømland Records)

References

External links 
 

Norwegian Academy of Music alumni
Norwegian jazz horn players
Norwegian jazz composers
Norwegian contemporary classical composers
Norwegian classical horn players
Women horn players
Musicians from Hof, Vestfold
1969 births
Living people
Musicians from Drammen
Women classical composers
21st-century trumpeters
21st-century women musicians
Trondheim Jazz Orchestra members
Grappa Music artists
Jazzland Recordings (1997) artists
Women trumpeters